Daniel Chițoiu (born July 11, 1967) is a Romanian economist who served as the country's Finance Minister from December 2012 to March 2014.

Notes

1967 births
People from Vâlcea County
Bucharest Academy of Economic Studies alumni
20th-century Romanian economists
Romanian Ministers of Finance
Living people
21st-century Romanian economists